Andrew Lane is a pop-hip hop-R&B record producer and songwriter. He was born in San Diego, California.

Lane has worked with artists such as Backstreet Boys and Irene Cara. As a producer and songwriter, Lane has received gold and platinum accreditations for his work with R&B artists Speech, Keith Sweat, and Alsou. He also worked on the platinum-accredited records High School Musical, Hannah Montana, Disneymania 4, and Manny Fresh.

2012 Billboard Awards Winning producer Andrew Lane has teamed up with MP3 Music Awards to offer US Demo Recording contracts to the 2012 BUA Award Winner - Best Unsigned Act

In 1995, Lane relocated to Atlanta, Georgia, and formed the company Drew Right Music, Inc. In the fall of 1998, Lane received a producing-songwriting credit for three songs on Keith Sweat's Didn’t See Me Coming album.

Between 1998 and 2001, Lane produced and wrote songs for Universal, Elektra. and EMI.

In 2000, Lane wrote "Solo" for Russian pop star Alsou. Alsou represented Russia in the Eurovision Song Contest 2000 with this song and finished second. Subsequently, the single was released on Universal Music Russia and included in her first English album released in 2001.

In 2003, Lane produced and co-wrote the song “Don’t Even Try”, which was used in the Disney movie Pixel Perfect, and became part of the soundtrack that charted for several weeks on the Billboard Top 200.

In 2006, Lane, along with several other writers and producers, worked on the High School Musical and Hannah Montana soundtracks. Lane produced, mixed, and programmed B5's version of “Get Your Head in Tha Game” which sold over 4.7 million copies.

In 2007–2009, Lane discovered and produced the Clique Girls, who landed a record deal with Interscope Records.

Lane has 11 songs featured in the film Bring It On (Fight to the Finish).

Andrew is the older brother of Disabled Journalist Paul Amadeus Lane.

Discography

References

External links
 Official site

African-American record producers
African-American songwriters
Living people
Year of birth missing (living people)
21st-century African-American people